Obra or Obras may refer to:

 Obra (river), a river in west Poland
 Obra, Uttar Pradesh, a town in the Indian state of Uttar Pradesh, India
 Obra, Bihar, a town in Bihar, India
 Obra, Bihar Assembly constituency, Bihar
 Obra, Uttar Pradesh Assembly constituency, India
 Obra, Greater Poland Voivodeship, in west-central Poland
 Öbrä, a village in Biektaw District, Tatarstan, Russia
 Tiento, a musical genre also known as obra
 Oregon Bicycle Racing Association
 Obra (TV drama), a TV drama series on GTV in Ghana
 Obra (TV program), a drama anthology airing on GMA Network
 Obras Sanitarias, an Argentine basketball team
 Estadio Obras Sanitarias, stadium of the Argentine team, also used for music concerts
 Omnibus Budget Reconciliation Act of 1990, a United States statute signed by President George H.W. Bush
 Omnibus Budget Reconciliation Act of 1993, a United States statute signed by President Bill Clinton